The 23×152mmB is a large-caliber cartridge used by the USSR/CIS in the VYa-23 aircraft autocannon the Ilyushin Il-2 ground attack aircraft and in the 2A7 and 2A14 autocannons on the ZU-23-2 anti-aircraft gun series and ZSU-23-4 "Shilka", among others. 

Note that the ammunition for the VYa-23 uses a brass case and is not functionally interchangeable with the steel-cased ammunition of the modern ZU-23 anti-aircraft gun series. These two weapons use different headspace sizes, therefore requiring ammunition of slightly different dimensions.
While it is no longer in use in the main anti-aircraft weapons of modern Russia, being replaced by the 30×165mm, it is still in service with the Russian Naval Infantry and many other countries.

Specifications

Iran has produced the Baher anti-material rifle chambered for this round. The stated purpose is to take down helicopters and vehicles.

See also 
 23×115mm, used mainly in aircraft weapons such as bomber defense guns and fighter aircraft

References

Large-caliber cartridges
Anti-aircraft guns of the Soviet Union
Anti-materiel cartridges
Aircraft guns of the Soviet Union